Centre Dufferin District High School is the public high school for Shelburne, Ontario. It is part of the Upper Grand District School Board.

Athletics
Athletic teams, known as the Royals, include badminton, basketball, cross country running, curling, field hockey, football, rugby, golf, ice hockey, soccer, track and field, volleyball and Centre Dufferin plays in the Central Western Ontario Secondary Schools Association (CWOSSA) in Districts 4 & 10.

See also
List of high schools in Ontario

References
 Profile at Upper Grand District School Board website

External links
 Centre Dufferin District High School website

Educational institutions established in 1940
1940 establishments in Ontario